This is a list of a selection of pubs in the city of Norwich in Norfolk, England. Only a selection of pubs are listed, organised by district and postcode (in brackets). The oldest of Norwich's pubs date back to the 13th century, such as The Adam and Eve, in Bishopgate. It is alleged that Norwich once had a pub for every day of the year, boasting as many as 600 in 1884, but today only has around 130 still open.

Pubs in central Norwich (NR1)

 The Adam and Eve, Bishopgate. Is thought to date to 1249, and is Grade II listed.
 Sir Garnet, Market Place. A Grade II listed pub dating to around 1500, looking over Norwich Market.
 The Bell Hotel, Orford Hill. A large Grade II* listed former coaching inn and hotel. Built during the 17th century, it is now a Wetherspoons chain pub.
 St Andrews Brew House, formerly known as The Festival House. A large Grade II listed corner pub.
 Coach and Horses, Bethel Street. A Grade II listed inn dating to the 16th and 17th century. Now owned by Greene King.
 The Dog House, St Georges Street. Formerly named The Red Lion, it dates to the early 17th century and is Grade II listed.
 The Rumsey Wells, St Andrews Street. Formerly The Shrub House, it is Grade II listed and now owned by Adnams.
 The Louis Marchesi, Tombland. Formerly known as The Waggon & Horses, it dates back to the late 15th century and is Grade II* listed.
 The Pig & Whistle, Westlegate. A city centre pub formerly known as The Tuns, it was rebuilt in 1937.
 The Murderers, Timberhill. Also known as The Gardeners Arms, it dates back to the 17th century and is Grade II listed. It gained it notorious name after a 19th-century landlord was convicted of murdering his wife, and subsequently executed.
 The Vine, Dove Street. Officially the smallest pub in Norwich, it is also a Thai restaurant upstairs.
 The Lamb, Orford Place. A popular city-centre pub, there has been an inn on this site since 12th century.
 The Walnut Tree Shades, Old Post Office Yard
 The Birdcage, Pottergate. Originally built in 1859, the pub was redesigned in the Art Deco style in the 1930s. Formerly known as The Morning Star, The Brown Derby and The Pottergate Tavern it was reopened as The Birdcage in 2006. 
 The Micawbers Tavern, Pottergate. Dating back to 1772 with later alterations, the building is Grade II listed, and was formerly known as The Alma.
 The Ten Bells, St Benedicts Street. Dating back to 1740, the pub is now owned by Greene King brewery.
 The Plough, St Benedicts Street. Dates back to 1600, with the front bar dating to 1800. The pub is owned by Grain Brewery.
 The Strangers Tavern, Charing Cross. Until recently was known as The Hog in Armour, and The Mash Tun, a gin palace.
 The Belgian Monk, Pottergate
 The Wildman, Bedford Street. A popular city-centre pub, reputed to be one of the oldest in Norwich.
 The Edith Cavell, Tombland. Named after the nurse of the same name, the pub looks over the historic Tombland area.
 The Glasshouse, Wensum Street. A former glassworks, now owned by Wetherspoons.
 The Lawyer, Wensum Street. Now known as Chambers Cocktail Company.
 The Wig & Pen, St Martin-At-Palace Plain. Formerly known as The White Lion. Built in the 17th century and is Grade II listed.
 The Prince of Wales, Prince of Wales Road. Currently closed. The venue is advertising that it is soon reopening. 
 Pogue Mahon's, Prince of Wales Road. A new Irish pub, opened in the former Duke of Connaught pub which closed in 1968.
 Bedfords Arms, Bedford Street. Now known as Bedford's Bar, which contains a 14th Century crypt.
 The Last Pub Standing, King Street. Formerly known as The Nag's Head, it is now the last public house on the whole of King Street (hence its name), which once housed over 58 pubs during the 20th century.
 The Steam Packet, Crown Road. A former Adnams pub, the pub dates to the 19th century and was formerly known as The Market Tavern.
 The Compleat Angler, Prince of Wales Road. Currently run by Greene King, it was initially built as a toll house for the bridge, and known as The Norfolk Railway House.
 The Woolpack, Golden Ball Street. Currently run by Greene King.
 The Champion, located on the corner of Chapelfield Road / St Stephen's road. A small, former Lacons pub that survived demolition for the inner ring road during the 1960s. It is currently owned by pub company and brewers, Batemans Brewery. Celebrates it connection to boxing with wall pictures. A warm and hospitable welcome from a well-run community-based pub.
 The Trowel & Hammer, St Stephens Road
 The Coachmakers Arms, St Stephens Road. A Grade II listed, 17th-century coaching inn.

Pubs in Norwich Over the Water (NR3)

 The Kings Head, Magdalen Street. A Grade II listed 17th-century pub. Has won CAMRA Branch Pub of the Year twice.
 The Mischief, Wensum Street. A former merchants house, Grade II listed and dating to 1599.
 The Plasterers Arms, Cowgate, a Victorian corner pub, popular with craft beer enthusiasts.
 The Blueberry, Cowgate, a music venue, formerly known as St Paul's Tavern. Currently closed.
 The Golden Star, Duke Street. A 17th century small corner pub which is Grade II listed. Now owned by Greene King.
 The Woolpack Yard, Muspole Street. Now known as The Gatherers, it is a former 18th-century weavers house, and is Grade II listed.
 The White Lion, Oak Street. A small cider pub dating back to the 1600s, it is the last surviving public house on Oak Street, which used to have over thirty.
 The Queens Arms, Magdalen Street. Now known as The Cactus Cafe Bar.

Pubs in North Norwich (NR3)

 The Artichoke, Magdalen Road, a 1930s flint building, originally decorated in the Brewers Tudor style.
 The Malt & Mardle, Magdalen Street. A new micro pub that opened in 2021.
 The Stanley, Lawson Road, built in 1890, it has recently been renovated.
 The Leopard, Bull Close Road
 The Marlborough Arms, Marlborough Road. Large corner pub built in 1892.
 The Cottage, Silver Road
 The Robin Hood, Mousehold Street. Victorian corner pub built in 1888.
 The Dyers Arms, Lawson Road, a corner pub dating back to 1858. 
 The Rosebery, Rosebery Road
 The Whalebone, Magdalen Road
 The Duke of Wellington, Waterloo Road
 The Prince of Denmark, Denmark Road
 The Angel Gardens, Angel Road
 The Catherine Wheel, St Augustines Street, a Grade II listed pub dating back to the late 19th century.
 The Fat Cat Brewery Tap, formerly known as The Wherry, it is run by the Fat Cat Brewery.
 The Heath House,  Gertrude Road

Pubs in East Norwich (NR1)

 The Coach & Horses, Thorpe Road. A Victorian Grade II listed pub, currently run by Chalk Hill Brewery. 
 The Jubilee, St Leonards Road. A Victorian corner pub, built 1887.
 Lollard's Pit, Rosary Road. Dates back to the 15th century, it is also Grade II listed.
 The Red Lion, Bishopgate. A large Victorian corner pub.
 The Castle, Spitalfields. Grade II listed, built c. 1830.
 The William IV, Quebec Road
 The Fat Cat & Canary, Thorpe Road. Formerly known as The Mustard Pot, it is run by the Fat Cat Brewery.
 The Windmill, Knox Road. Next to Norwich Prison, the pub is currently closed.
 The Heartsease, Plumstead Road. Dating back to 1840, the pub is now run by Greene King.

Pubs in South Norwich (NR1)
 The Surrey Tavern, Surrey Street. Built 1851.
 The Berestrete Gates, Ber Street. Officially the last surviving pub on Ber Street, it is situated next to the site of the old Ber Street gate.
 The Rose Inn, Queens Road. Built 1855.
 The Kings Arms, Hall Road. Built 1832.
 The Freemasons Arms, Hall Road. Built 1822
 The Trafford Arms, Grove Road. Rebuilt in 1955 after severe damage by enemy action June 1942.

Pubs in West Norwich (NR2)

 The Fat Cat, West End Street, opened in 1868 as The New Inn. It is run by the Fat Cat Brewery and won CAMRA's National Pub of the Year.
 The Perseverance, Adelaide Street. It closed in 2015 and reopened as The Fat Percy by the Fat Cat Brewery.
 The Gibraltar Gardens, Heigham Street. A Grade II listed 15th century timber-framed house by the River Wensum. Was a Flemish weaver's house in 1500s and became an Ale House about 1704.
 The Nelson, Nelson Street
 West End Retreat, Browne Street. The last surviving pre-war structure in this area to survive demolition, the pub dates back to 1840.
 The Belle Vue, St Philips Road. A large Victorian corner pub, built in 1878.
 The Alexandra Tavern, Stafford Street. 
 The Reindeer, Dereham Road
 The Earlham Arms, Earlham Road
 The Mitre, Earlham Road
 The Black Horse, Earlham Road
 The Garden House, Pembroke Road
 The William & Florence, Unthank Road. Formerly known as The Rose Valley, now an Adnams pub.
 Temple Bar, Unthank Road. Formerly known as The Tuns. 17th century and Grade II listed.
 The Warwick Arms, Warwick Street.
 The Eaton Cottage, Unthank Road
 The Rose Tavern, Rupert Street
 The York, Leicester Street
 The Unthank Arms, Newmarket Street
 The Eagle, Newmarket Road
 The Beehive, Leopold Road
 The Farmhouse, Colman Road
 The Coach & Horses, Union Street

Notable pubs in surrounding Norwich
 The Gatehouse, Dereham Road. A Grade II listed public house built in 1934.
 The Brickmakers, Sprowston Road. A large music venue, opened as a public house in 1863.
 White Horse, The Street, Trowse.
 Crown Point Tavern, Kirby Road, Trowse.
 The Red Lion, Eaton. A late 17th century pub, Grade II* listed.
 The Rushcutters, Yarmouth Road. Formerly known as The Boat & Bottle, it is Grade II listed and dates to the 16th century.
 The Buck, Yarmouth Road. Dates back to the 17th century and is Grade II listed. Currently closed.
 The Rivergarden, Yarmouth Road. Formerly known as The Kings Head, Grade II listed.

Notable closed pubs in Norwich

 The Jolly Butchers, Ber Street. A large 18th-century pub, it became famous for the landlady Black Anna, who was also a well-known jazz singer. Closed 1988 and is Grade II listed,.
 The Marquee, Cattle Market Street. Also known as The Owl Sanctuary, a popular music venue, it suddenly closed in 2016.
 The Ferry Boat Inn, King Street, a Grade II listed pub  which dates back to 1822. It closed in 2006, after serving as a live music venue.
 The Cat & Fiddle, Magdalen Street, a Grade II listed pub that was built in 1760. It closed in 2011 after a troubling few years.
 The Magpie, Magpie Road, built 1870, it contains some of the old city wall in back wall of the cellar. Closed 2006 and recently converted into residential.
 The George & Dragon, Hay Hill. A 19th century Grade II listed pub in the city centre. Closed 1988, now a McDonald's restaurant.
 The Branford Arms, built 1895, also known as The Brandford Stores. Closed in 2009 and converted to residential.
 The Plough, Farmers Avenue, also known as Le Rouen. A Grade II listed former pub dating back to the 17th century on the old Cattlemarket. It closed in 2017.
 The Dolphin Inn, Heigham Street. A Grade II* listed flint building and former Bishop Hall's Palace, dating to 1595.
 The Ironmongers Arms, Lobster Lane. A late 17th-century former pub, closed 2003 and is Grade II listed.
 The Rifleman, Cross Lane. A 17th century pub, Grade II listed that closed in 1963.
 The Cherry Tree, Pitt Street. Formerly known as the Golden Sovereign, it is the only building to survive 1970s demolition in the area. Closed 1988.

Notable demolished pubs in Norwich

 The Earl of Leicester, Dereham Road. Built 1904, the pub was controversially demolished in 2005, in spite of local objections. The site is still derelict today.
 The New Star, Quayside. An ancient 16th-century timber-framed house, which was demolished in 1963. It was then discovered that it was not a Tudor building but one of earlier date, incorporating a former mediaeval warehouse, the only one of its kind to have survived in the city up to that time.
 The Clarence Harbour, Carrow Road. Built in 1837, the pub stood near Carrow Road football stadium. Demolished 2004.
 The Kings Arms, Botolph Street. Built in 1646, the ancient pub was demolished in 1973 to make way for the Anglia Square Shopping Centre.
 The Griffin, Yarmouth Road. An 18th-century coaching inn that closed in 2015 and was demolished in late 2021 after a suspected fire.

See also
 Public houses
 List of bars
 List of pubs in the United Kingdom
 List of public house topics

References

Notes

Bibliography
 Norwich Pubs and Breweries Past and Present, 2015, Frances and Michael Holmes . .
 Inns and Taverns of Old Norwich, 1975, John Riddington Young.

External links

 Norwich Pub Guide

Buildings and structures in Norwich
Culture in Norwich
Pubs in Norfolk
Pubs in Norwich
Norwich
Lists of buildings and structures in Norfolk
Norwich
Norwich